The Niels Juel class was a three-ship class of corvettes formerly in service with the Royal Danish Navy. They were built in Denmark at Aalborg Shipyard and were launched in the period 1978–1980. In 1998–2000 the three vessels had a mid-life update, as well as a large update on the electrical systems.

All three vessels were named after famous Danish admirals, with the debatable exception of Peter Tordenskjold, a Norwegian-born officer who served during the personal union of Norway and Denmark from 1415 to 1814.

These ships were replaced by the s.
All three ships were retired in 2009  and were scrapped in 2013 at Munkebo, Denmark.

Design
During the mid-life refit, the corvettes were modified to be able to use the StanFlex modular mission payload system; two module slots were installed aft of the superstructure.

Duties

The corvettes played an active role in solving a wide spectrum of duties, including escort and protection of other vessels. They were built to the requirements of the Cold War era, notably the need for guarding and convoy duty in the strategically important Danish Belts. Like many assets built during this period, adapting it to changing needs in the post–Cold War period was challenging, but the Niels Juel class benefited from being built from the outset as austere, economical vessels with a large number of possible roles to play. Also among the various tasks for the corvettes were coast guard duties in Danish national waters, as well as intelligence gathering.

It was normal routine for the Danish corvettes to participate in international operations. On several occasions, the vessels took part in operations for NATO, UN, OSCE and coalition forces.

List of ships

References

Corvette classes